This is a list of notable Brazilian film directors born in Brazil or who have established Brazilian citizenship or residency.

Pioneers 
 Lima Barreto
 Humberto Mauro
 Mário Peixoto

Cinema Novo 
 Joaquim Pedro de Andrade
 Cacá Diegues
 Ruy Guerra
 Leon Hirszman
 Arnaldo Jabor
 Glauber Rocha
 Roberto Santos
 Nelson Pereira dos Santos
 Paulo César Saraceni

Cinema marginal 
 Júlio Bressane
 José Mojica Marins
 Rogério Sganzerla
 João Silvério Trevisan

Others in the 60s/70s/80s 
 Hector Babenco
 Ana Carolina
 Eduardo Coutinho
 Anselmo Duarte
 Roberto Farias
 Walter Hugo Khouri
 Walter Lima, Jr.
 Luis Sérgio Person

Retoma and Post Retomada 

 Alê Abreu
 Aluizio Abranches
 Gilda de Abreu
 Carine Adler
 Karim Aïnouz
 Renalto Alves
 Tata Amaral
 Fernando Grostein Andrade
 João Batista de Andrade
 Joel Zito Araújo
 Cláudio Assis
 Bruno Barreto
 Fábio Barreto
 Luiz de Barros
 Laís Bodanzky
 Beto Brant
 João Callegaro
 Carla Camurati
 Maurice Capovila
 Arturo Carrari
 Luiz Fernando Carvalho
 Alberto Cavalcanti
 César Charlone
 Carlos Coimbra
 Heitor Dhalia
 Miguel Faria, Jr.
 Daniel Filho
 Jorge Furtado
 Cao Hamburger
 Carlos Imperial
 Tatiana Issa
 Natalia Leite
 Kátia Lund
 Sérgio Machado
 Amácio Mazzaropi
 Fernando Meirelles
 Selton Mello
 Flávio Migliaccio
 Jayme Monjardim
 David Neves
 Carlos Augusto de Oliveira
 José Padilha
 Tom Payne
 Paulo Porto
 Afonso Poyart
 Guilherme de Almeida Prado
 Helvécio Ratton
 Sérgio Rezende
 Daniel Ribeiro
 Sérgio Ricardo
 Juliana Rojas
 João Moreira Salles
 Walter Salles
 Roberto Santucci
 David Schurmann
 Silvio Tendler
 Paulo Thiago
 Daniela Thomas
 Sérgio Toledo
 Pedro Vasconcellos
 Andrucha Waddington
 Tizuka Yamasaki

Brazil
 
Directors